Michael Kuchmiak, C.Ss.R. (February 5, 1923 – August 26, 2008) was a bishop of the Ukrainian Greek Catholic Church and titular bishop of Agathopolis since 1988.

Kuchmiak was born in Obertyn, Ukraine. The Synod of Bishops of the Ukrainian Catholic Church and Pope John Paul II appointed Kuchmiak as auxiliary bishop of the Ukrainian Catholic Archeparchy of Philadelphia on 8 March 1988.

He received his episcopal ordination on 27 April 1988, with Stephen Sulyk, Archeparch of Philadelphia, as his principal consecrator and Maxim Hermaniuk and Innocent Lotocky as co-consecrators.  He remained pastor of the Ukrainian Catholic National Shrine of the Holy Family in Washington, D.C. until his appointment on 11 July 1989 as the Apostolic Exarch of the Apostolic Exarchate for Ukrainians in Great Britain.

On April 5, 2002, the Pope accepted the resignation of Apostolic Exarch Mykhailo Kuchmyak from the government in connection with his reaching the age of retirement. Kuchmiak died in 2008 in Saskatoon, Saskatchewan, Canada.

See also
Ukrainian Greek Catholic Church
Apostolic Exarchate for Ukrainians

Citations

References

External links
 Catholic Church in England and Wales page
 GCatholic.org information 

Bishops of the Ukrainian Greek Catholic Church
Ukrainian emigrants to Canada
1923 births
2008 deaths
American Eastern Catholic bishops
American people of Ukrainian descent
Canadian people of Ukrainian descent
Redemptorist bishops
20th-century Eastern Catholic bishops
21st-century Eastern Catholic bishops
Eastern Catholic bishops in the United Kingdom
20th-century American clergy
21st-century American clergy